Three Lakes High School is a public high school in Albany, Oregon, United States. It is located at the Oak Creek Youth Correctional Facility. It is primarily a female-only institution but also serves transgender students.

Academics
In 2008, 0% of the school's seniors received a high school diploma. Of 21 students, none graduated, four dropped out, and 17 were still in high school the following year.

References

High schools in Linn County, Oregon
Buildings and structures in Albany, Oregon
Boarding schools in Oregon
Educational institutions established in 1997
Public high schools in Oregon
1997 establishments in Oregon